Charles Webster is a British electronic music producer and DJ who specialises in producing house music, amongst several other genres, including downtempo and jazz. He has recorded under his own name as well as under a series of aliases including Presence, Furry Phreaks, and Love From San Francisco, and in collaboration with several other artists.

Webster ran the now-defunct record labels Remote and Love From San Francisco, but currently owns and operates his Miso Records label.

History
Born in Matlock, Derbyshire, Charles Webster grew up in the Peak District. His father was an artist and his mother (in his own words) "just worked at whatever she felt like at the time", and his parents' record collection was an early influence, Webster stating that "it was when they got into Kraftwerk that I decided to become a musician". He got his first instruments at age 13 (guitar, synthesizer, and drum machine). He studied art in Derby before moving to Nottingham where he began playing in electronic bands (including Mile High Club) and started working in a restaurant – the owner of which also just happened to own the city's 'Garage Club', where he began performing.

Webster worked with US artists such as Juan Atkins, Derrick May, and Kevin Saunderson through his job as a recording engineer at Square Dance studios in Derby, and moved to San Francisco in 1992 where he started the Love From San Francisco label. This led to his music being released on other US labels.

Back in the UK in 1996, Webster started the Remote label. The All Systems Gone album, released in 1999 and credited to the ensemble Presence, which featured singers Shara Nelson, Sara Jay, and Steve Edwards, was described by Webster as "a collection of songs for the clubs and the home", and included the singles "Sense of Danger" (featuring Nelson), "Future Love", and "Better Day". The album was well received by critics, garnering an 11/10 rating from DJ magazine, and described by Allmusic as "Probably the first classic record of the 21st century."

Born on the 24th of July (Peacefrog Records) was recorded over an 18-month period between 1999 and 2000, and released in 2001, featuring contributions from Terra Deva, and Massive Attack vocalist Sara Jay. A remixed version of Born on the 24th of July was released in late 2003, featuring mixes by several Peacefrog label artists.<ref name="Theakston">Theakston, Rob "[https://www.allmusic.com/album/remixed-on-the-24th-of-july-mw0000323284 Remixed on the 24th of July Review]", Allmusic. Retrieved 16 June 2014</ref> After five years of touring and production, 2007 saw the release of a definitive three-disc Webster compilation project on Defected Records, followed in 2008 by a Coast 2 Coast compilation for NRK Records and Strictly Rhythms Vol. 4.

2013 saw the release of two albums from Webster — a retrospective compilation on Defected called House Masters: Charles Webster, and a modern big band jazz album with Pete Wraight (as the Wraight-Webster Ensemble), No Lucky Days.Schubert, Carolina (2013) "Webster Wraight Ensemble", Mixmag Brasil, 14 May 2013. Retrieved 16 June 2014

He has been working on his album 2021 we are all still waiting for when the album go dropDiscography

Albums
 1999 All Systems Gone as 'Presence'
 2001 Born on the 24th of July as Charles Webster
 2003 Remixed on the 24th of July as Charles Webster
 2013 No Lucky Days (with Peter Wraight) as 'Webster Wraight Ensemble'
 2020 Decision Time as Charles Webster

Compilations
 2005 "What's Phat Pussy Cat 4" on CCP Record Company
 2007 "Defected Presents Charles Webster" on Defected Records
 2008 "Coast 2 Coast" on NRK Records
 2010 "Strictly Rhythms Vol. 4" on Strictly Rhythm
 2010 "Pioneers of House: Charles Webster" on Soul Candi
 2011 "Studio Soul" on Do It Now Recordings
 2013 "House Masters Charles Webster" on Defected Records

Singles
Charles Webster
 1996 "Random House Vol. 1" (with Paul K. Joyce)
 2000 "Your Life" (with Mark Sheridan and Sara Jay)
 2001 "I Understand You" (with Delroy St. Joseph)
 2002 "It's Not What It Was"
 2002 "Ready" (with Terra Deva)
 2011 "I Am The Sun" (with Cathy Battistessa)
 2011 "Fight For Freedom" (with Thandi Draai)
 2012 "Be Yourself" (with Diviniti)
 2012 "Lonely" (with Diviniti)
 2012 "Learning to Love Me" (with Diviniti)
 2012 "Give Me More" (with Shana Halligan)
 2012 "Our Jewel" (with January Tuesday)
 2014 "Searching for my life" (Siya aka Solo)

Presence
 1995 "My Baby"
 1996 "The Spectrum EP"
 1996 "The Strength"
 1996 "Unreleased Stuff Vol. 1/2"
 1997 "Better Day" (with Steve Edwards)
 1997 "Remixes"
 1998 "White Powder EP"
 1998 "Sense of Danger" (with Shara Nelson)
 1999 "Future Love" (with Steve Edwards)

Furry Phreaks
 1994 "Gonna Find a Way"
 1995 "Want Me Like Water" (with Terra Deva)
 1996 "Soothe" (with Terra Deva)
 1997 "Remixes"
 2001 "Want Me Like Water 2001" (with Terra Deva)
 2005 "Mixed Messages EP"
 2007 "All Over the World" (with Terra Deva)

DJ Profile
 1997 "The EP"
 1998 "Prove It"
 1998 "Unreleased Stuff Vol. 3/4"
 2000 "Simpletone EP"

Sine
 1992 "Deep Anxiety EP" (with Sara Jay)
 1992 "I Like It Deep"
 1993 "Round and Round" (with Sara Jay)

Hot Lizard
 All with Gary Marsden and Paul Wain 1995 "The Theme"
 1996 "Big Air"
 1996 "165... Drop"
 1998 "Tokyo Traffic"

Symetrics
 All with Andrew Hulme and Roger Horberry''
 1993 "Anyway"
 1993 "Drop EP"
 1996 "EP 01"
 1997 "Life Goes On"

Other aliases
 1992 "Belgium", as Megatonk
 1992 "Disco Heave", as Smooch
 1992 "Demonise", as Yukon
 1993 "We Can Work It Out", as Good Together
 1993 "Don't Stop", as Unique
 1994 "I'll Hear Your Body", as Positive
 1994 "Keep to the Beat", as The Boy
 1994 "Keep Rockin", as Love From San Francisco
 1994 "Switch", as Natural
 1994 "Happy Trax EP", as Together Trax
 1995 "Sidetracked", as Mendocino
 1996 "The Florida Fantasy EP", as Love From San Francisco
 1996 "You Make Me Feel", as City of Angels
 1997 "Instant Coco", as Taster's Choice (with Ron Trent)
 1998 "Boxed", as Starpeace
 1999 "For the Music", as Colourful Karma (with Terra Deva)
 1999 "Kinda Kickin'", as DJ Boom (with Matthew Herbert)
 2002 "21st Century Blues", as lo:rise (with Mark Sheridan and Sara Jay)
 2003 "For the Music (Remixes)", as Colourful Karma (with Terra Deva)
 2005 "Life Goes On", as lo:rise (with Sara Jay)
 2008 "The Brighter Side", as Version (with Martin Iveson)

References

External links
 
 

Year of birth missing (living people)
Living people
British house musicians
English house musicians
Remixers
Musicians from Nottinghamshire
Peacefrog Records artists